is a Japanese football player. He plays for Criacao Shinjuku.

Career
Yu Yonehara joined J3 League club Criacao Shinjuku in 2020.

Club statistics
Updated to 22 February 2018.

References

External links

1994 births
Living people
Kwansei Gakuin University alumni
Association football people from Hyōgo Prefecture
Japanese footballers
J3 League players
SC Sagamihara players
Association football defenders